This is a list of tram routes on the tram network in Melbourne, Australia, operated by Yarra Trams.

Current routes
Services that deviate from the regular routes below (by diversion or early-termination) are suffixed with the letter 'a', while services diverting to and/or terminating at the depot are suffixed with 'd'.

Special event services

Discontinued routes
This is the list of Melbourne tram routes that have been discontinued or replaced. Tram routes that ran short-workings or temporary routes are not included. Routes changed or removed due to the conversion of cable tram lines are also not included.

References

External links
History of Melbourne Tram Routes 1950-2009
Network map Victoria Department of Transport

Tram routes
Tram routes
Public transport in Melbourne
Trams in Melbourne